The Skate of Marrister is a flat ledge that extends about  from the western shore of Whalsay, in the Shetland islands of Scotland. There is a risk that the strong tide in Whalsay Sound (Linga Sound) will carry a boat onto the Skate.
There is a minor light on the Skate with a nominal range of four miles, flashing green every six seconds.

Piltock may be caught around the skate.

References
Citations

Sources

Islets of Whalsay
Uninhabited islands of Shetland
Skerries of Scotland